The 1928 United States Senate election in Tennessee was held on November 6, 1928. Incumbent Democratic Senator Kenneth McKellar was re-elected to a third term in office, defeating Republican Mayor of Knoxville James A. Fowler.

Democratic primary

Candidates
George L. Casey
Finis James Garrett, U.S. Representative from Weakley County and House Minority Leader
Kenneth McKellar, incumbent Senator since 1917
John Randolph Neal Jr., attorney, academic, and perennial candidate for Governor

Results

General election

Candidates
James Alexander Fowler, Mayor of Knoxville (Republican)
Kenneth McKellar, incumbent Senator since 1917 (Democratic)

Results

See also
1928 United States Senate elections

References

1928
Tennessee
United States Senate